Benito Cereno  is a 1969 French film directed by Serge Roullet. It is based on the novella Benito Cereno, by American writer Herman Melville.

Synopsis 
In 1799 the black slaves being transported in a three mast ship captained by the South American, Benito Cereno, rebel. After killing part of the crew, they subdue the captain. The rebel slaves order him to set sail for Africa, but the ship runs into trouble. Delano, the U.S. Captain of a whaler comes to their assistance. Once aboard, everything seems to be in order. The slaves act like slaves. But certain details disturb Delano.

External links 

 

French drama films
1960s French films
Films based on American novels